Tridentea gemmiflora ("twin-flowered tridentea") is a species of plant in the family Apocynaceae. It is endemic to South Africa and is common in the Little Karoo and Western Cape Province.  Its natural habitats are rocky areas.

References

Flora of South Africa
gemmiflora
Least concern plants